is a song recorded by Japanese music duo Yoasobi from their debut EP, The Book (2021). It was released on May 11, 2020, through Sony Music Entertainment Japan. The song depicts the protagonist who spends days of disappointment after parting with her lover, finding hope while re-questioning her dreams and the meaning of life, and regains her motivation to move into the future. The English version of the song was included on the duo's second English-language EP E-Side 2, released on November 18, 2022.

"Halzion" was based on Soredemo, Happy End, a short story written by Hashizume Shunki, marking the first time that Yoasobi collaborated with a professional novelist. Unlike the duo's former two songs, the source material was not based on the novel-centered social media Monogatary.com. The song and the story it is based on were released as part of an advertising campaign Immersive Song Project by Suntory, to promote their new energy drink branded Zone. The campaign also included songs by Kizuna Ai and Kaf.

Usage in media 

Beside Zone, "Halzion" is also appeared in EA's 2014 video game, The Sims 4 — which was added into the base game via a patch released on November 10, 2020. It can be heard through the S-Pop (Sim-Pop) radio station and has been re-written in Simlish. Additionally, the song appeared on the 2020 Gekidan No Meets stage Mukō no Kuni, and Nintendo Switch 2021 televised advertisement Jibun Jikan-hen.

Credits and personnel
Credits adapted from The Book liner notes.

Song
 Ayase – producer, songwriter
 Ikura – vocals
 Hashizume Shunki – based story writer
 Takayuki Saitō – vocal recording
 Masahiko Fukui – mixing

Music video

 Toshitaka Shinoda (Ijigen Tokyo) – director
 Yuuki "Youkiss" Ookubo (Ijigen Tokyo) – productor
 Rabbit Machine – 2D animation director
 No.1Ø – 2D lead animator
 Fungakki – 2D animator
 Yuta Kuniyasu (Calf) – illustrator, animation director, animator
 Ryo Okawara – animation director, animator
 Shuma Hirose (Calf) – animation producer
 Ippei Kurahashi – animator
 Kanae Miya – animator
 Yoshihiko Shimoda – animator
 Takayuki Oguma – composite editor (DTJ)
 Matawe Wongpuak – assistant editor (DTJ)

Charts

Weekly charts

Year-end charts

Certifications

Release history

References

External links 
 Soredemo, Happy End  on Immersive Zone Project

2020 singles
2020 songs
Japanese-language songs
Sony Music Entertainment Japan singles
Yoasobi songs